Dream Machines is a reality TV show broadcast by the channel Syfy. It features the Parker brothers building concept cars for celebrities or organizations, they (along with the series) are located in Melbourne, Florida.

Episode List

Season 1 
Episode 1 "50 Cent's Jet Car"
In the first aired episode, 50 Cent orders a Formula One race car to be built in a strict time limit and the brothers face a few security issues which include a break-in.

Episode 2 "50 Cent's Jet Car Takes Off"

Episode 3 "Attack of the Pink & Green Machines"

Episode 4 "Autotrader.com Mars Rover"

Episode 5 "John Cena's Incenarator"

Episode 6 "The Battleship Shredder"

References

External links 
 
 
http://www.commonsensemedia.org/tv-reviews/dream-machines (a review of the show)

2010s American reality television series
2012 American television series debuts
2012 American television series endings
Syfy original programming
Television shows set in Florida